The Jordan barbel (Luciobarbus longiceps) is a species of ray-finned fish in the  family Cyprinidae. It is found in Israel, Jordan, and Syria. Its natural habitats are rivers and freshwater lakes. It is threatened by habitat loss.

References

 

Luciobarbus
Fish described in 1842
Taxonomy articles created by Polbot